Konstantin Belikov (1909 – 3 July 1987) was a Soviet football defender and referee. Master of Sports of the USSR.

Belikov was born in Zuyevo. He started playing football in local team Krasny Tekstilshchik. In the early 1930s he served in the army, then moved to Stalingrad, where until 1938 played for the team Dynamo Stalingrad.

In 1939 he moved to the main team city – Traktor Stalingrad, which played in Soviet Top League. In the same year helped the team to take the highest place in the history of the team's performance in Soviet Top League – 4th place.

During the Great Patriotic War Konstantin Belikov went to the front, took part in the Battle of Stalingrad, and in May 1943, after the battle, was one of the participants of the famous .

3 February 1943 received the medal "For Battle Merit". Was also awarded the medal "For the Defence of Stalingrad".

After completing his playing career, worked football referee.

He died in 1987 in Volgograd.

References

Sources
 
 

1909 births
People from Orekhovo-Zuyevo
1987 deaths
Soviet footballers
FC Sokol Saratov players
FC Rotor Volgograd players
Soviet football referees
Association football defenders
FC Znamya Truda Orekhovo-Zuyevo players